Bluff City may refer to:

Memphis, Tennessee
Bluff City (album), by the Compulsive Gamblers
Bluff City Law,  a 2019 fiction TV series set in Memphis, Tennessee

Places in the United States
Bluff City, Alaska
Bluff City, Arkansas
Bluff City, Fayette County, Illinois
Bluff City, Schuyler County, Illinois
Bluff City, Kansas
Bluff City, Tennessee
Eufaula, Alabama
Bluff, Utah